Plenty of Horn may refer to:

Plenty of Horn (Paul Horn album), 1958
Plenty of Horn (Ted Curson album), 1961

See also
Horn of Plenty (disambiguation)